James Warden (born June 22, 1954) is a former professional ice hockey goaltender.

High school career
Warden attended The Blake School (Minneapolis) for his junior and senior years, where he earned all-state honors.

College career
At the 1975 NCAA Division I Men's Ice Hockey Tournament, Warden was named Most Outstanding Player while also winning a national title.

Professional career

WHA Draft
He was picked in the 3rd round, 36th overall, by the San Diego Mariners in the 1974 WHA Amateur Draft.

NHL Draft
He was picked in the 5th round, 75th overall, by the California Golden Seals in the 1974 NHL amateur draft.

Minor league career
Warden competed in the Central Hockey League and the Atlantic Coast Hockey League.

International career
Warden competed for the United States at the 1976 Winter Olympics.

References

External links

1954 births
American men's ice hockey goaltenders
Ice hockey player-coaches
Ice hockey players at the 1976 Winter Olympics
Living people
Olympic ice hockey players of the United States
NCAA men's ice hockey national champions
California Golden Seals draft picks
San Diego Mariners draft picks